"Real Real Gone" is a hit single written by Northern Irish singer-songwriter Van Morrison and included on his 1990 album Enlightenment. It has remained a popular live performance tune and Morrison has included it on the set lists at many of his concerts since releasing it.

Recording and composition
It was originally intended for the album Common One that was recorded in February 1980 at Super Bear Studios in France, but as the tempo became too lively with Herbie Armstrong's rhythm guitar, it didn't fit in with the other songs in the album. The song that is a track on the album, Enlightenment was recorded during the sessions that took place in 1989 with Mick Glossop as producer.

In a review for the album Enlightenment, Rolling Stone called the song "Real Real Gone" his most engaging R&B raveup since the days of 'Domino'"

Other releases
Real Real Gone was also included on the 1993 compilation album The Best of Van Morrison Volume Two. It was included briefly during the "In the Garden" medley, before "You Send Me" on the live album A Night in San Francisco. In 1998 an outtake of it appeared on the compilation album The Philosopher's Stone. As it appeared in the movie Donovan Quick, it was included in the 2007 compilation album Van Morrison at the Movies - Soundtrack Hits. As a medley with "You Send Me", it was one of the songs performed when Morrison appeared at the Austin City Limits Festival in 2006 and was included on the limited edition album, Live at Austin City Limits Festival. A remastered version of this song is included on the 2007 compilation album, Still on Top - The Greatest Hits.

Real Real Gone was re-recorded with Michael Buble for the Duets: Re-working the Catalogue album, released in March 2015.

Personnel on original release
Van Morrison – vocals
Bernie Holland – guitar
Steve Gregory – tenor saxophone
Dave Bishop – baritone saxophone
Malcolm Griffiths – trombone
Georgie Fame – organ
Steve Pearce – bass guitar
Dave Early – drums

Personnel on The Philosopher's Stone
Van Morrison – vocals
John Allair – organ
Herbie Armstrong – rhythm guitar
Mick Cox – guitar
Pee Wee Ellis – tenor saxophone
David Hayes – bass
Mark Isham – trumpet, flugelhorn
Peter Van Hooke – drums

Covers
Tom Fogerty covered "Real Real Gone" on his 1981 album Deal It Out. Other covers of the song are by Bettye LaVette on Vanthology: A Tribute to Van Morrison and it was released as a single by Herbie Armstrong in 1981.

Charts

Notes

References
Heylin, Clinton (2003). Can You Feel the Silence? Van Morrison: A New Biography,  Chicago Review Press 

1990 singles
Van Morrison songs
Songs written by Van Morrison
1989 songs
Polydor Records singles
Song recordings produced by Van Morrison